Lumefantrine (or benflumetol) is an antimalarial drug. It is only used in combination with artemether. The term "co-artemether" is sometimes used to describe this combination. Lumefantrine has a much longer half-life compared to artemether, and is therefore thought to clear any residual parasites that remain after combination treatment.

Lumefantrine, along with pyronaridine and naphtoquine, were synthesized during the Chinese Project 523 antimalaria drug research effort initiated in 1967; these compounds are all used in combination antimalaria therapies.

See also
 Artemether/lumefantrine
 Halofantrine

References 

Secondary alcohols
Amines
Antimalarial agents
Chinese discoveries
Chlorobenzenes
CYP2D6 inhibitors
Fluorenes
Phenylethanolamines
Butyl compounds